Total Drama is a Canadian animated comedy television series that began airing on Teletoon in 2007 in Canada and on Cartoon Network in 2008 in the United States. The first season, titled Total Drama Island, follows twenty-two contestants on a reality show of the same name. A second season, titled Total Drama Action, began airing in 2009, this time following fourteen (later fifteen) returning contestants. The third season, Total Drama World Tour, began in June 2010, and follows fifteen returning contestants along with two (later three) new contestants. The show's fourth season, Total Drama: Revenge of the Island, began airing in 2012, and was the first season to feature an entirely new set of contestants. The fifth season began airing in 2014, and was split into two parts, Total Drama All-Stars and Total Drama: Pahkitew Island. The first part features contestants from the first four seasons, while the second part introduces new contestants.

A spin-off, titled Total Drama Presents: The Ridonculous Race, began airing on Cartoon Network Canada, in 2016. Like the original series, it follows contestants of a reality game show, The Ridonculous Race. Four contestants from Total Drama compete in the spin-off, while three other characters make silent cameos. Another spin-off series, titled Total DramaRama, premiered in September 2018. It features several returning characters from Total Drama and one character from 6teen which includes seven males (Cody, Duncan, Harold, Jude, Lightning, Noah, and Owen) and seven females (Beth, Bridgette, Courtney, Gwen, Izzy, Leshawna, and Sugar). Other characters such as DJ, Katie, and Trent were shown as background characters. Ella and Max appeared in a 2-part episode.

Cast

 Courtney is voiced by Rachel Wilson from 1x01 to 1x02. Emilie-Claire Barlow began voicing her in 1x03.
 Alejandro is voiced by Marco Grazinni from 2x27 to 3x26 and by Keith Oliver in the 3x26 post-credit scene. Alex House began voicing him in 5x01.
 The killer is voiced by Scott McCord in 1x19. Brian Froud voiced him in 5x01.
 Despite his character, Josh, not appearing, Dwayne Hill is still credited at the end of Total Drama World Tour.
 Cory Doran also does the voice of all of Mike's alternate personalities.
 Chef Hatchet is voiced by Clé Bennett from 1x01 to 5x26. Deven Mack began voicing him in Total DramaRama.
 Leshawna is voiced by Novie Edwards from 1x01 to 3x26. Bahia Watson began voicing her in Total DramaRama.
 Gwen is voiced by Megan Fahlenbock from 1x01 to 5x13. Lilly Bartlam began voicing her in Total DramaRama. Fahlenbock voices an elderly version of Gwen in 1x14.
 Noah is voiced by Carter Hayden from Total Drama Island to The Ridonculous Race. Cory Doran, the original voice of Mike from Revenge of the Island, began voicing Noah in Total DramaRama.
 Harold is voiced by Brian Froud from 1x01 to 3x26. Darren Frost began voicing him in Total DramaRama.
 Cody is voiced by Peter Oldring from 1x01 to 3x26. Wyatt White began voicing him in Total DramaRama.
 Max is voiced by Bruce Dow from 5x14 to 5x23. Tristan Mammitzsch began voicing him in Total DramaRama.
 Lightning is voiced by Tyrone Savage from 4x01 to 5x03. Kwaku Adu-Poku began voicing him in Total DramaRama.

Characters

Hosts
Chris McLean (voiced by Christian Potenza) is the Scottish Canadian host of the main Total Drama series. Although he is a popular television personality, Chris is egomaniacal to a fault, often foregoing or willingly going against the contestants' happiness and well-being if it means getting more viewers. This makes him universally hated by the contestants, with their hatred of him being the only thing they can all agree on. While Chris prefers to remain out of the challenges and act more impartially at the beginning of the series, he increasingly becomes more involved to the point of criminal activity. Chris' narcissism causes him to do more things focusing on him (such as making Total Drama Action'''s symbol of immunity a "gilded Chris award").
Chef Hatchet (voiced by Clé Bennett and later Deven Mack in Total DramaRama) is the African Canadian chef for the Total Drama series, and the occasional co-host. While not considered an official host, he has hosted on several occasions when Chris is absent. Chef is a large man with a drill sergeant approach to almost everything. He notoriously only cooks horrible food.
Don (voiced by Terry McGurrin) is the host of The Ridonculous Race. Unlike his Total Drama counterpart, Don is always trying to be impartial during challenges, and often shows concern for the contestants' safety when in dangerous situations. Although not to the same extent as Chris, Don has shown to have a slight ego, often adding in small comments about his looks.

Contestants
Debuted in Total Drama Island
Beth (voiced by Sarah Gadon) is a contestant on Total Drama Island and Total Drama Action. She is a friendly girl who tends to get along with everybody due to her amiable behavior. She appears geeky with large glasses, a sideways ponytail and braces, the latter of which was removed between seasons. She initially forms an alliance with Heather, but breaks it off due to Heather's bossy attitude before she is voted off due to accidentally cursing her team with an idol she took from Boney Island. In Total Drama Action, she forms a strong friendship with Lindsay and eventually makes it to the finale with Duncan. She also claimed to be dating a handsome boy named Brady, which the other contestants doubted until he showed up in the finale.
Bridgette (voiced by Kristin Fairlie) is a contestant on Total Drama Island, Total Drama Action, and Total Drama World Tour. She is a surfer chick and vegetarian who is passionate about tending animals, even healing a wild bear in Siberia. She starts dating Geoff after both are eliminated during the first season, and the two end up being the first eliminated in the second season due to their constant makeout sessions annoying everyone, resulting in them becoming the Aftermath hosts. During World Tour, Bridgette is eliminated after she is tricked by Alejandro into kissing a frozen pole. It also strains her relationship with Geoff, but they manage to move past it.
Cody Emmett Jameson Anderson (voiced by Peter Oldring and later Wyatt White on Total DramaRama) is a contestant on Total Drama Island and Total Drama World Tour. He is a geek that tries to be cool but fails constantly. He has a crush on Gwen, who only sees him as an annoying little brother, but puts it aside to help his teammate Trent in the first season. He was voted off after getting mauled by a bear and suffered severe injuries, but recovers after his elimination.  During World Tour, he is freaked out by Sierra's creepy devotion to him and constantly tries to get rid of her, but accepts her as a friend at the end of the season. He makes it to the final three, but decides to help Heather defeat Alejandro after the latter eliminates him and nearly gets him killed by a shark.
Courtney (voiced by Rachel Wilson in the first two episodes of Total Drama Island and Emilie-Claire Barlow in all other episodes) is a contestant on Total Drama Island, Total Drama Action, Total Drama World Tour, and Total Drama All-Stars. She is stubborn, highly uptight and very strict, often trying to commandeer her team to no avail. During the first season, she forms a relationship with Duncan, whom she is initially at odds with for his rebellious nature. She is wrongfully eliminated when Harold tampered with the votes in an attempt to get back at Duncan. In the second season, she files a lawsuit that results in her being allowed to compete when she didn't initially qualify and becomes the main antagonist before she is voted off by Duncan and Beth before the finale. In the third season, she becomes friends with Gwen, but turns against her and Duncan after the two become a couple. She is later seduced by Alejandro, eventually resulting in her elimination. In All-Stars, she begins to date Scott and rekindles her friendship with Gwen after the latter breaks up with Duncan, but after the other contestants find out she made a chart to plan their eliminations, her new relationships are ruined and she is voted off yet again.
DJ (voiced by Clé Bennett) is a contestant on Total Drama Island, Total Drama Action, and Total Drama World Tour. He is kind and considerate to others, is a talented cook, and loves animals and his mother. In the first season, he is eliminated after failing a horror-themed challenge. In the second season, Chef Hatchet forms an alliance with him to make him tougher. However, he decides that being in the alliance is wrong and quits the game. In the third season, DJ develops bad luck and starts accidentally injuring animals during his challenges. Despite his attempts to eliminate himself to save the creatures, he ends up as the last one on his team before losing the game.
Duncan (voiced by Drew Nelson) is a contestant on Total Drama Island, Total Drama Action, Total Drama World Tour, and Total Drama All-Stars. He is a punk rebel and an ex-convict from juvenile detention. During the first two seasons, he develops a relationship with Courtney but eventually breaks up with her due to her strict nature. In Total Drama Island, he makes it to the final four, but is eliminated by Chef after he and Owen fail a team challenge (with Chef taking pleasure in it due to Duncan annoying him throughout the season). In Total Drama Action, he is targeted for elimination multiple times after Courtney returns to the show, but is often spared by luck or the eliminations of other contestants, which helps him make it into the finale with Beth. In Total Drama World Tour, he initially quits the show in the first episode, but is forcibly brought back to compete again. When he returns, he kisses Gwen and begins to date her much to Courtney's ire. After making the final five, he is voted off when Alejandro and Heather form an alliance. In All-Stars, he becomes obsessed with getting Courtney's attention and proving to his colleagues and the audience that he isn't nice, which causes Gwen to dump him, and he is arrested after he blows up Chris's mansion.
Eva (voiced by Julia Chantrey) is a contestant on Total Drama Island. She has a fiery temper which causes her to be the second one voted off the island in the first season after losing her MP3 player (which Heather secretly stole). She returns later in the season after the teams are merged, but her temper results in a quick second elimination after she targets Bridgette for supposedly getting her eliminated.
Ezekiel (voiced by Peter Oldring) is a contestant on Total Drama Island and Total Drama World Tour. He is a Canadian homeschooled farm boy and is the first one voted off for making sexist comments about the female contestants. After his elimination, he attempts to develop a rapper-like persona. In World Tour, he is voted off first once again when he costs his team the challenge, but he secretly stays on the plane without Chris' knowledge. Over the course of the season, Ezekiel slowly transforms into a feral creature who roams the plane in a desperate attempt to claim the prize money, resulting in it getting destroyed. He returned in both Revenge of the Island and All-Stars, serving as an obstacle for both new and old contestants as he remains a permanent resident of Camp Wawanakwa and later Boney Island.
Geoff (voiced by Dan Petronijevic) is a contestant on Total Drama Island, Total Drama Action, and The Ridonculous Race. He is a surfer with a positive attitude and is always up for a party. During the first season, he develops a crush on Bridgette and the two become a couple. While he makes it far, he is voted off from other contestants fearing his positive attitude if it came down to a popularity contest. After he and Bridgette are the first ones eliminated in the second season, they become the hosts of Total Drama Aftermath, where they interview the eliminated contestants and showcase highlights from the season. The fame of the show causes him to act extremely self-centered, but he eventually changes back. He continues to host the Aftermath show in season three, though grows irritated with his new cohost, Blainely. In The Ridonculous Race, he competes with his best friend Brody as his teammate.
Gwen (voiced by Megan Fahlenbock) is a contestant on Total Drama Island, Total Drama Action, Total Drama World Tour, and Total Drama All-Stars. A gothic girl who does not initially like socializing with others. In the first season, she develops a crush on Trent and the two begin dating after she became a finalist with Owen and eliminated her rival, Heather. During the second season, her and Trent's relationship deteriorates after they are placed on separate teams and she eventually breaks up with him when he starts throwing challenges for her. She is eliminated after she throws her team's challenge to make up for Trent's actions to the other team. In season three, she becomes friends with Courtney, but destroys their friendship by kissing Duncan and begins dating him, eventually resulting in Courtney eliminating her during a tiebreaker challenge. In All-Stars, she makes several attempts to mend her friendship with Courtney and is eventually successful after breaking up with Duncan, only for it to backfire and fail after she finds out about Courtney's elimination chart. She is the last one of the original contestants eliminated, but she and Cameron help Mike and Zoey with during the finale.
Harold Norbert Cheever Doris McGrady V (voiced by Brian Froud) is a contestant on Total Drama Island, Total Drama Action, and Total Drama World Tour. He is an awkward nerd who is constantly bullied by Duncan. Despite his demeanor, he displays several talents such as beat boxing, poetry, and quick reflexes. After his elimination, he reveals he has feelings for Leshawna and the two kiss before he leaves the island. During the second season, he is initially bullied by Duncan again, and is the first to discover Owen was sabotaging the competition, but was eliminated before he could warn the others. In the third season, he quits the show early after causing his team to lose the challenge in Japan.
Heather (voiced by Rachel Wilson) is a contestant on Total Drama Island, Total Drama Action, Total Drama World Tour, and Total Drama All-Stars. A mean and snobby girl who won't stop at anything to win the million dollar cash prize, she acts as the main antagonist during the first season. Heather manipulates Lindsay and Beth to join her secret alliance before ultimately getting them eliminated, and picks extreme rivalries with Gwen and Leshawna, despite all three of them being teammates. She makes it to the final three, but is eliminated after Gwen and Owen team up against her in the dare challenge, which also results in her hair getting shaved off. During the second season, she is obsessed with trying to find a way to cover up her bald head and is eliminated by her team after losing to Beth in a badminton challenge. In the third season, she forms an intense rivalry with Alejandro but eventually develops feelings for him as well. She manages to make it to the final round where Alejandro confesses his feelings for her and she uses it to manipulate him turning the game in her favor, but ends up losing the money after she either accidentally gives Alejandro the win or Ezekiel steals it from her. In Revenge of the Island, she attempts to steal the cash prize of the season, but is stopped by the new contestants. In All-Stars, she competes against Alejandro once more, who eliminates her before the teams merge by stealing the immunity statue from her. After he is eventually voted off, the two begin dating.
Izzy (voiced by Katie Crown) is a contestant on Total Drama Island, Total Drama Action, and Total Drama World Tour. A zany jungle girl who is very hyperactive and a compulsive liar. In the first season, she leaves early after the Royal Canadian Mounted Police chase her out for causing a major explosion during the challenge, but later returns as a contestant after the teams are merged. Before her second elimination, she begins a relationship with Owen. In the second season, she goes by the aliases of "E-Scope" and "Explosivo" and once again is eliminated twice. In the third season, several blows to her head result in her becoming a genius and breaking up with Owen. She is taken out of the competition by the military, who plan to put her new mind to work, though she eventually receives another blow to the head and returns to her zanier personality.
Justin (voiced by Adam Reid) is a model contestant on Total Drama Island and Total Drama Action. A handsome boy who makes girls, boys and animals swoon when he stares into their eyes. He is mostly silent in the first season and eliminated early on thanks to Heather manipulating her teammates in a talent-themed challenge. In Total Drama Action, he displays more of a shrewd and vain personality and keeps worrying about his appearance while scheming and plotting, serving as the main antagonist before Courtney returns and overshadows him. During a princess-themed challenge, he develops feelings for Courtney, but she does not reciprocate them and votes with Duncan to eliminate him. His main admirers are Katie, Sadie, Lindsay, and Beth.
Katie (voiced by Stephanie Anne Mills) is a contestant on Total Drama Island and Sadie's best friend. They dress alike, but she is skinnier with a tan. She was voted off after she and Sadie cause their team to lose a camping challenge, with Katie receiving the extra vote.
Leshawna (voiced by Novie Edwards) is a contestant on Total Drama Island, Total Drama Action, and Total Drama World Tour. She is a sassy and bold girl. During the first season, she forms a strong friendship with Gwen and a fierce rivalry against Heather. When Harold is eliminated, he reveals his feelings for her before he leaves the island. Despite their mutual attraction, she breaks it off with him due to believing they went too fast into it, though they remain friends. She made it to the final five in the first season before she was accidentally voted off by the eliminated campers. In the second season, she tricks her team into giving her the spa reward from one of the challenges and bad-mouths the other contestants to her cousin Leshaniqua, leading everyone to distrust her and eventually vote her off. In the third season, she is eliminated early after being seduced and tricked by Alejandro, but rekindles her relationship with Harold.
Lindsay (voiced by Stephanie Anne Mills) is an attractive contestant on Total Drama Island, Total Drama Action, Total Drama World Tour, and Total Drama All-Stars. She is a stereotypical dumb blonde who has a sweet, bubbly personality. In Total Drama Island, she becomes part of an alliance with Heather, who forces her to various demeaning tasks. She also begins dating Tyler, but has a hard time remembering his name and who he is after his elimination. She ultimately learns how cruel Heather is when the former's actions result in her elimination and finally stands up to her. She later attains revenge by being the one to initiate Heather getting her head shaved during the dare challenge. In Total Drama Action, Lindsay becomes best friends with Beth, who was also part of Heather's initial alliance. Despite getting far in the competition, she ends up accidentally voting herself off. In Total Drama World Tour, Lindsay eventually remembers who Tyler is and the two resume dating before getting eliminated after losing to DJ in a tiebreaker challenge (despite DJ's attempts to throw the challenge). In All-Stars, she is voted off first for costing her team the challenge.
Mr. Coconut is an inanimate object on Total Drama Island that was created by Owen in the episode "Camp Castaways" after being isolated from the other campers. He was later eliminated in the same episode, though he continues to make cameo appearances in later seasons. 
Noah (voiced by Carter Hayden) is a contestant on Total Drama Island, Total Drama World Tour, and The Ridonculous Race. A cynical, sarcastic boy, he is voted off quickly in the first season for refusing to participate in the dodgeball challenge and constantly insulting his teammates. In the third season, he becomes best friends with Owen, but is eliminated in London after expressing his distrust of Alejandro to Owen. In The Ridonculous Race, Noah competes with Owen as the "Reality TV Pros", as the two have competed on several reality shows since the third season. During the competition, he falls in love with Emma of the "Sisters" team and the two eventually begin dating after both teams were eliminated.
Owen (voiced by Scott McCord) is an overweight bumbling contestant on Total Drama Island, Total Drama Action, Total Drama World Tour, and The Ridonculous Race. A contestant who loves to eat and has an enthusiastic personality, he always sees people in a positive light, becoming the only contestant to befriend Chris. He dates Izzy until she breaks up with him in the third season. Despite the odds, he eventually becomes a finalist in the first season with Gwen. In the second season, he is eliminated by Courtney before the teams merge, but is brought back as a mole to get the other contestants to sabotage each other. He is eliminated once more after Courtney and Beth find out his secret. During the third season, he becomes friends with Noah and unintentionally annoys Alejandro with his energetic personality and constantly calling him "Al" but grows suspicious of the latter after Noah warns him of Alejandro's true nature. After the teams merge, Alejandro manipulates the others into voting him off due to his popularity. He later competes with Noah in The Ridonculous Race as "The Reality TV Pros", as the two have been on several reality shows since the third season, and he and Kitty help Noah and Emma develop a relationship.
Sadie (voiced by Lauren Lipson) is a contestant on Total Drama Island and Katie's best friend. The two dress alike and have similar personalities, but Sadie is heavier and shorter. She struggled to compete after Katie's elimination and was eventually voted off after she injured Courtney during a trust-based challenge.
Trent (voiced by Scott McCord) is a contestant on Total Drama Island and Total Drama Action. A guitar player with a laid back attitude who has a crush on Gwen during the first season, but is eliminated after Heather tricks him into kissing her and Leshawna convinces the other contestants into voting him off for Gwen's sake. Despite this, he and Gwen eventually become a couple in the finale. During the second season, his relationship with Gwen is strained after they are put on opposite teams. He becomes desperate to impress her to the point where he starts throwing his team's challenges, eventually resulting in his elimination and Gwen breaking up with him. Though he continues pining for her, he ends up becoming the object of affection for Katie and Sadie.
Tyler (voiced by Peter Oldring) is a contestant on Total Drama Island and Total Drama World Tour. An uncoordinated athlete who frequently injures himself. In the first season, he is eliminated after his fear of chickens costs his team one of the challenges. He and Lindsay begin dating during the first season, but after his elimination, Lindsay has a hard time remembering who he is. In the third season, Lindsay doesn't even remember his name until soon before Lindsay's elimination challenge. He allies himself with Alejandro, but is eliminated after costing his team the win during the Area 51 challenge.

Debuted in Total Drama World Tour
Alejandro Burromuerto (Burromuertos in Total Drama All-Stars) (voiced by Marco Grazzini in TDWT and Alex House in TDAS) is a contestant on Total Drama World Tour and Total Drama All-Stars. A charming, Hispanic boy who is the main antagonist of the third season. He instigated the eliminations of nearly every other contestant in the season, either by exploiting his looks or sowing discord among the others. He also talks about his impressive family from time to time (crediting his relatives for the skills he has garnered to this day), but loathes his brother José for being subjectively better than him and for calling him "Al" on purpose (the latter which Owen does repeatedly since he cannot pronounce "Alejandro"). He creates a long lasting rivalry with Heather, one of the few people to actually see through his manipulations and actively work against him, but he eventually falls in love with her (although he tries hard not to admit it). Amidst the chaos of the final challenge, he is trampled by the other contestants and burned by lava, forcing Chris to place him inside the robotic "Drama Machine" so he can sign release forms for the incident, and allowing him to recover from his injuries for a year. He returns in All-Stars, where he attempts to warn the other contestants of Mal's evil nature, but is voted off due to the contestants' own distrust of him and his heinous actions. After his elimination, he begins dating Heather.
Blaineley (voiced by Carla Collins) is the host from Celebrity Manhunt before moving to Total Drama Aftermath and she was briefly a contestant on Total Drama World Tour. She frequently clashed with Bridgette and Geoff as she attempted to incite drama in their love, leading the latter to trick Blaineley into winning the "Second Chance" challenge to become a contestant on Total Drama World Tour. She is voted off alongside Courtney when it's revealed she attempted to make a secret alliance with Chef to help her win (both were eliminated and did not have a tiebreaker challenge due to budget cuts on the show).
Sierra (voiced by Annick Obonsawin) is a contestant on Total Drama World Tour and Total Drama All-Stars. A Total Drama fan girl and blogger who has a massive crush on Cody. During the third season, she makes multiple attempts to make Cody fall in love with her, leaving the latter often terrified at her advances. Sierra ultimately places fourth after Chris disqualifies her for accidentally blowing up the plane they were traveling on. She returns in All Stars, where her mind begins to slowly deteriorate and causes her to mistake Cameron for Cody. Cameron convinces his teammates to vote her off for both of their sakes.

Debuted in Total Drama: Revenge of the Island
Anne Maria (voiced by Athena Karkanis) is a contestant on Total Drama: Revenge of the Island. A woman who is obsessed with her looks, she ends up in a love triangle with Mike and Zoey as she is infatuated with Mike's alternate personality, Vito. During the mine challenge, she receives a large diamond from the feral Ezekiel. Thinking she no longer needs the million, and not knowing the diamond is worthless, she quits the show.
"B" is a contestant on Total Drama: Revenge of the Island. He is an intelligent individual who does not speak. In the second episode, his real name is revealed to be Beverly. He is voted off after Scott throws a challenge for his team and frames B for the loss.
Brick McArthur (voiced by Jon Cor) is a contestant on Total Drama: Revenge of the Island. A military cadet that always follows his creed and forms a rivalry with Jo. Even though he is a disciplined cadet, he often displays a sensitive side that his enemies take advantage of. He is voted off for rescuing the other team during the challenge in the mines.
Cameron Corduroy Wilkins (voiced by Kevin Duhaney) is a contestant on Total Drama: Revenge of the Island and Total Drama All-Stars. An intelligent computer nerd who is physically frail as a result of his mother raising him in a bubble. He eventually makes it to the finale of the fourth season with Lightning. In All-Stars, Cameron becomes the target of Sierra's affections as she begins mistaking him for Cody. During the 100th episode, he is severely injured after he and Gwen rescued the contestants from Ezekiel, resulting in his elimination. He later assists Zoey in the final two with Gwen.
Dakota Milton (voiced by Carleigh Beverly) is a contestant on Total Drama: Revenge of the Island. A fame-hungry girl who is eliminated early in the competition after her desire for camera time costs her team the challenge. She returns to the island to get more screen time, which Chris accepts by making her an intern. After Chris sends her into a mine filled with radiation to test it for the contestants, she mutates into a giant monster that Sam calls "The Dakotazoid". She begins dating Sam after her mutation. She also began competing again in Anne Maria's place, but was eliminated again immediately (which she did not mind this time) when Scott protected himself with the immunity statue.
Dawn (voiced by Caitlynne Medrek) is an English Canadian contestant on Total Drama: Revenge of the Island. She is a nature lover who is shown to be able to read peoples' feelings through aura. She is voted off after Scott frames her for stealing the other contestants' belongings.
Jo (voiced by Laurie Elliott) is a contestant on Total Drama: Revenge of the Island and Total Drama All-Stars. A competitive jock who's willing to go to any lengths to win. She forms intense rivalries with Brick and Lightning and makes multiple alliances along the way to stay in the game before eventually betraying them. Her last alliance with Cameron led to her downfall after he betrays her, something she was proud of. In All-Stars, she is voted off shortly afterwards for her confrontational attitude and costing her team the challenge.
Lightning (voiced by Tyrone Savage) is a jock bully contestant on Total Drama: Revenge of the Island and Total Drama All-Stars. An arrogant athlete who is talented at football and refers to himself in the third person. Despite his lack of intelligence, he makes it to the finale and faces off against Cameron. After getting struck by lightning indirectly by Cameron in the final episode, his hair turns white. In the following season, he is eliminated early after his egotistical attitude costs his team the challenge. According to the Fresh TV website, Lightning's real name is actually "Rudolph Jackson."
Mike (voiced by Cory Doran) is a contestant on Total Drama: Revenge of the Island and Total Drama All-Stars. A boy who has multiple personalities: the grumpy old man Chester, Russian gymnast Svetlana, Italian tough guy Vito, adventurer Manitoba Smith, and hidden evil Mal. In the fourth season, he develops feelings for Zoey, but is afraid to reveal his disorder to her, which Scott takes advantage of to win the go-kart challenge and eliminate him. In All-Stars, his alternate personality Mal takes over his body and becomes the main antagonist for the season. Mike and his other personalities work together inside his subconscious to escape and kill Mal by hitting a "reset button" that leaves Mike as the sole personality as he competed in the finale with Zoey.
Sam (voiced by Brian Froud) is a contestant on Total Drama: Revenge of the Island and Total Drama All-Stars. An overweight gamer with a generally optimistic attitude. He develops a crush on Dakota and eventually begins dating her after she mutates from radiation exposure. He is eliminated after his lack of physical strength costs his team the challenge. In All-Stars, he is eliminated after he was caught cheating during the pancake eating challenge in an effort to save food in case he got sent to Boney Island.
Scott (voiced by James Wallis) is a contestant on Total Drama: Revenge of the Island and Total Drama All-Stars. A scheming farmboy who serves as the main antagonist of the fourth season. He continuously sabotages his own team so he could control who gets voted off. He also is constantly chased by the mutant shark Fang after he lost one of his teeth to Scott, eventually injuring Scott to the point of him needing to heal in a "trauma chair". In All-Stars, Scott develops a relationship with Courtney, but eventually breaks up with her after she depicts him as a rat in her elimination chart. He gets eliminated by Zoey due to her making a promise with Mike to bring to the finale.
Staci (voiced by Ashley Peters) is a contestant on Total Drama: Revenge of the Island. An extremely talkative girl who is voted off first due to exaggerating about her family and lying on how they invented everything.
Zoey (voiced by Barbara Mamabolo) is a contestant on Total Drama: Revenge of the Island and Total Drama All-Stars. A kind, retro girl from a small town. During the fourth season, she develops feelings for Mike, but finds it difficult to start a relationship due to the latter's attempts to hide his multiple personalities and Anne Maria's crush on Vito. In All-Stars, Zoey is warned by the other contestants about Mal's manipulations, but doesn't initially believe them due to their own distrustful nature and her relationship with Mike. She makes it to the finale with Mike and eventually helps him overcome Mal's influence.

Debuted in Total Drama: Pahkitew Island
Amy (voiced by Bryn McAuley) is a contestant on Total Drama: Pahkitew Island. She is Samey's twin sister, whom she constantly bullies. When Amy frames Samey for losing one of the team's challenges, Samey is able to convince the others that Amy is her after Amy eats a poisonous apple and loses her ability to speak. After Amy's elimination, she swims back to the island to get revenge on her sister, resulting in both of their eliminations. After her elimination again, with Samey this time, their conflict is never resolved. 
Beardo (voiced by Clé Bennett) is a contestant on Total Drama: Pahkitew Island. Beardo annoyed the other contestants with his ability to make convincing sound effects, which results in him getting voted off first.
Dave (voiced by Daniel DeSanto) is a contestant on Total Drama: Pahkitew Island. A germophobe who sees himself as the only "normal" contestant on the show, Dave thinks logically about challenges but is very critical of his teammates. He develops a crush on Sky, but when she rejects his advances, he convinces the other contestants to vote him off. He becomes Sky's teammate in the finale, but turns against her after finding out she was dating someone prior to coming on the show, trying to win $1 million to burn in front of her in revenge, but fails. At the end of the episode he's accidentally abandoned on the island by Chris and the other contestants and is forced to face the scuba bear 3.0 again. It's unknown what happened to him after the show ended and it's even unknown is dead or alive.
Ella (voiced by Sunday Muse) is a contestant on Total Drama: Pahkitew Island. A girl who loves singing who gets along with animals. After Chris threatens to eliminate her if she sings any further, Sugar convinces her to sing to help her teammates during a challenge before sending Chris an anonymous tip to get her eliminated.
Jasmine (voiced by Katie Bergin) is a contestant on Total Drama: Pahkitew Island. A tall Australian survivalist, she is very outgoing and intimidating, but also cares a lot about her teammates and her crush, Shawn. She makes it to the final four, but is eliminated after Sugar sabotages her during the challenge. In the finale, Chris turns her against Shawn by revealing how he didn't want to split the prize money with her, but the two are able to reconcile regardless if Shawn ends up winning or not.
Leonard (voiced by Clé Bennett) is a contestant on Total Drama: Pahkitew Island and The Ridonculous Race. A lover of Live Action Role Playing Games, he dresses as a wizard and believes he has magical abilities, which result in early eliminations on both of the shows he competed on.
Max (voiced by Bruce Dow) is a contestant on Total Drama: Pahkitew Island. He is an aspiring supervillain who constantly schemes, but in actuality is very incompetent. He sees Scarlett as his evil assistant, greatly annoying her in the process.
Rodney (voiced by Ian Ronningen) is a contestant on Total Drama: Pahkitew Island. A kind and caring country boy who constantly falls in love with any girl for the simplest of gestures. He is eventually voted off when his crushes on multiple contestants causes his team to lose a truth-or-dare challenge.
Samey (voiced by Bryn McAuley) is a contestant on Total Drama: Pahkitew Island. The polar opposite of Amy, Samey is very kind, but timid due to constant abuse from her sister. She prefers to be called Sammy, but Amy gets everyone to refer to her as Samey. Samey gets revenge on her sister by tricking Amy into eating a poisonous apple that makes her unable to talk, allowing her to dupe the others into thinking Amy is her. She pretends to be Amy to remain in the competition before the real Amy returns to the island for revenge, resulting in both of their eliminations. It's unknown how their conflict will continue.
Scarlett (voiced by Kristi Friday) is a contestant on Total Drama: Pahkitew Island. She is a quiet, highly intelligent girl who helps out Max with his "evil" doings, much to her ire. When she finds the control room for the island, she reveals she is twisted and psychotic and threatens Chris and the other contestants' lives to get the prize money, but she is defeated and eliminated shortly afterwards.
Shawn (voiced by Zachary Bennett) is a contestant on Total Drama: Pahkitew Island. A firm believer in zombie apocalypse conspiracy theories, Shawn believes he is constantly on the run from zombies. He has a crush on Jasmine, but his fear of zombies often gets in the way of their relationship. He eventually makes it to the finale with Sky.
Sky (voiced by Sarah Podemski) is a contestant on Total Drama: Pahkitew Island. An aspiring Olympic gymnast, Sky tries to concentrate solely on winning the million dollars, but is often distracted by Dave. She eventually makes it to the finale with Shawn.
Sugar (voiced by Rochelle Wilson) is a contestant on Total Drama: Pahkitew Island. An unintelligent yet fearless pageant lover with disgusting habits. She develops an intense hatred for Ella despite the latter wanting to become friends with her. After making it to the final three, she is eliminated after performing the worst in her talent show challenge.
Topher (voiced by Christopher Jacot) is a contestant on Total Drama: Pahkitew Island. A huge fan of the show's host, Topher is often more focused on becoming the new Chris than the challenges. He eventually steals Chris' phone and attempts to convince the show's producers (later revealed to be Chris playing a trick on Topher) to allow him to replace Chris, eventually costing his team the challenge.

Debuted in The Ridonculous Race
Brody (voiced by Scott McCord) is a contestant on The Ridonculous Race. He competed with Geoff as the Surfer Dudes team. At the beginning of the race, he didn't really take the race seriously, but starts to after he and Geoff eventually return after being previously eliminated. He also develops a crush on MacArthur, one that she reciprocates over time but does not act on due to the competition.
Carrie and Devin (voiced by Kristin Fairlie and Jeff Geddis) are contestants on The Ridonculous Race. They compete as the Best Friends team. In the beginning of the season, they are best friends. However, it's quickly revealed that Carrie has been in love with Devin since the third grade, but Devin has a girlfriend named Shelley. After Shelley breaks up with him, Devin realizes he loves Carrie after going through the five stages of grief, but at this point she has given up hope of ever being with him. Eventually, they confess their feelings and begin to date, only for Devin to suffer a freak accident that seriously injures him, forcing them to quit the race. They choose the Surfer Dudes team to take their place in the race.
Chet and Lorenzo (voiced by Darren Frost and Carlos Díaz) are contestants on The Ridonculous Race. They compete as the Stepbrothers team. Before the race, Chet's mother marries Lorenzo's father, and the two have hated each other since then. In an attempt to get them to get along better, the parents forced Chet and Lorenzo to join the race. During the course of the competition, they begin to form a close bond as they realize they have similar interests.
Crimson and Ennui (voiced by Stacey DePass and Carter Hayden) are contestants on The Ridonculous Race. They compete as the Goths team. Despite their apathy for everything, especially the competition, they prove to be a competent team. While in Australia, they adopt a bunny and name him Loki. After Loki is stolen by the Ice Dancers, the Goths are eliminated while trying to look for him.
Dwayne and Junior (voiced by Neil Crone and Jacob Ewaniuk) are contestants on The Ridonculous Race. They compete as the Father & Son team. Dwayne is a happy-go-lucky middle-aged man who is desperately trying to please his son by acting cool and younger than he is. Junior is usually embarrassed by his father's antics and clumsiness. Despite Dwayne often failing to impress his son, they end up closer as the race progresses, with Junior appreciating his father's attempts.
Ellody and Mary (voiced by Emilie-Claire Barlow and Katie Griffin) are contestants on The Ridonculous Race. They compete as the Geniuses team. During the race, they often let their need to plan slow them down, which eventually results in their elimination during a sandcastle challenge.
Emma and Kitty (voiced by Stacey DePass and Stephanie Anne Mills) are contestants on The Ridonculous Race. They compete as the Sisters team. Emma is a no-nonsense, competitive law student who is distrustful of others after her last relationship, while Kitty is cheerful and easygoing. During the race, Emma falls in love with Noah, with both of their respective teammates helping to push their relationship forward, despite it causing some setbacks for both of their teams.
Gerry and Pete (voiced by David Huband and Adrian Truss) are contestants on The Ridonculous Race. They compete as the Tennis Rivals team. They are two retired professional tennis players who had a fierce rivalry growing up and decide to compete in the race so they can finally get along.
Jacques and Josee (voiced by Scott McCord and Julie Lemieux) are contestants on The Ridonculous Race. They compete as the Ice Dancers team. They are two highly competitive Canadian figure skaters who hate to finish anywhere other than first after embarrassing themselves at the Winter Olympics. They become the main antagonists as they typically resort to sabotaging the other contestants in a desperate attempt to claim first place, especially during the later parts of the season.
Jay and Mickey (both voiced by Lyon Smith) are contestants on The Ridonculous Race. They compete as the Adversity Twins team. They are a pair of frail identical twins who were born with many different allergies, phobias, and disorders on top of the terrible luck they tend to have.
Jen and Tom (voiced by Ashley Botting and Jeff Geddis) are contestants on The Ridonculous Race. They compete as the Fashion Bloggers team. As best friends, the two developed a very popular fashion blog and are always looking for new styles to try and promote. During the race, they get into an argument over who truly started the blog, but they eventually resolve their differences before they are eliminated.
Kelly and Taylor (voiced by Julie Lemieux and Bryn McAuley) are contestants on The Ridonculous Race. They compete as the Mother & Daughter team. Hailing from a rich family, Kelly is a trophy wife who is desperately clinging to her youth in a bid to appease her daughter. Taylor, who is rude and disrespectful towards her mother, believes she's a strong athlete as a result of being given many fake awards growing up. Kelly eventually takes Dwayne's advice and starts being stricter towards her daughter.
Laurie and Miles (voiced by Emilie-Claire Barlow and Katie Griffin) are contestants on The Ridonculous Race. They compete as the Vegans team. Much to their dismay, they end up being forced to eat meat during the Iceland leg. Laurie attacks Don after being told that the leg turns out to be a non-elimination leg, the resulting karma leading to their elimination in the next episode.
Rock and Spud (voiced by Carlos Díaz and Carter Hayden) are contestants on The Ridonculous Race. They compete as the Rockers team. Between the two, Spud is significantly more dim-witted and has a slower reaction time, leaving Rock to put in more of the work.
Ryan and Stephanie (voiced by Joseph Motiki and Nicki Burke) are contestants on The Ridonculous Race. They compete as the Daters team. Despite their initial strong passion, they grow to detest each other as the race goes on and break up, eventually calling themselves "The Haters" team. Near the end of the race, they make up and become a couple again.
Sanders and "MacArthur" (voiced by Nicole Stamp and Evany Rosen) are contestants on The Ridonculous Race. They compete as the Police Cadets team. Between the two, MacArthur is much more aggressive while Sanders is often the voice of reason. After MacArthur accidentally breaks Sanders' arm during one of the challenges and nearly costs them the race, she begins letting Sanders take charge more often. They form an aggressive rivalry with the Ice Dancers team and manage to eliminate them in the finale. In the episode "Got Venom," while stuck up in a tree surrounded by komodo dragons, MacArthur revealed that her full name is actually "Valentina Escobar".
Tammy (voiced by Nicki Burke) is a contestant on The Ridonculous Race''. She is Leonard's childhood friend and competed with him as the LARPERs team.

Debuted in Total Drama Island (2023)
Axel
Bowie
Caleb
Chase
Damien
Emma
Julia
MK
Millie
Nichelle
Priya
Raj
Ripper
Scary Girl
Wayne
Zee

Placements

References

2007 establishments in Canada
Lists of characters in Canadian television animation
Total Drama